Wright is a single-member electoral district for the South Australian House of Assembly. Named after the 19th century South Australian architect Edmund Wright, it is a  suburban electorate in Adelaide's outer north-east, taking in the suburbs of Brahma Lodge, Gulfview Heights, Modbury Heights, Redwood Park, Salisbury South and Wynn Vale, as well as parts of Salisbury East and Surrey Downs.

When created, Wright was a marginal Labor seat at the 1991 electoral distribution, taking in much of the abolished seat of Briggs. Wright was first contested at the 1993 election, where it was won by Liberal candidate Scott Ashenden as part of a large swing throughout the state. He was defeated at the 1997 election by Labor candidate Jennifer Rankine.

Rankine announced in February 2017 that she would be retiring from parliament as of the 2018 election.

Members for Wright

Election results

Notes

References
 ECSA profile for Wright: 2018
 ABC profile for Wright: 2018
 Poll Bludger profile for Wright: 2018

1993 establishments in Australia
Electoral districts of South Australia